The russet-capped tesia (Tesia everetti) is a species of Old World warbler in the family Cettiidae.  The scientific name commemorates British colonial administrator and zoological collector Alfred Hart Everett.

Distribution and habitat
It is found only in Indonesia.

References

russet-capped tesia
Birds of the Lesser Sunda Islands
Birds of Flores
russet-capped tesia
Taxonomy articles created by Polbot